Srima is a village in Croatia.

References

Populated places in Šibenik-Knin County